In computer science, a syntax error is an error in the syntax of a sequence of characters or tokens that is intended to be written in a particular programming language.

For compiled languages, syntax errors are detected at compile-time. A program will not compile until all syntax errors are corrected. For interpreted languages, however, a syntax error may be detected during program execution, and an interpreter's error messages might not differentiate syntax errors from errors of other kinds.

There is some disagreement as to just what errors are "syntax errors". For example, some would say that the use of an uninitialized variable's value in Java code is a syntax error, but many others would disagree and would classify this as a (static) semantic error.

In 8-bit home computers that used BASIC interpreter as their primary user interface, the  error message became somewhat notorious, as this was the response to any command or user input the interpreter could not parse.
A syntax error can occur or take place, when an invalid equation is being typed on a calculator. This can be caused, for instance, by opening brackets without closing them, or less commonly, entering several decimal points in one number.

In Java the following is a syntactically correct statement:
System.out.println("Hello World");

while the following is not:
System.out.println(Hello World);

The second example would theoretically print the variable Hello World instead of the words "Hello World". However, a variable in Java cannot have a space in between, so the syntactically correct line would be System.out.println(Hello_World).

A compiler will flag a syntax error when given source code that does not meet the requirements of the language's grammar.

Type errors (such as an attempt to apply the ++ increment operator to a boolean variable in Java) and undeclared variable errors are sometimes considered to be syntax errors when they are detected at compile-time. However, it is common to classify such errors as (static) semantic errors instead.

Syntax errors on calculators

A syntax error is one of several types of errors on calculators (most commonly found on scientific calculators and graphing calculators), representing that the equation that has been input has incorrect syntax of numbers, operations and so on. It can result in various ways, including but not limited to:
An open bracket without closing parenthesis (unless missing closing parenthesis is at very end of equation)
Using minus sign instead of negative symbol (or vice versa), which are distinct on most scientific calculators. Note that while some scientific calculators allow a minus sign to stand in for a negative symbol, the reverse is less common.

See also
Tag soup

References

Error
Computer errors
Parsing
Programming language theory